Biren De (1926–2011) was an Indian painter of modern art, known for his paintings with tantric influences. His paintings were characterized by symmetrical patterns of geometry and the presence of tantric symbols such as mandala, phallus and vagina, reportedly representing masculine and feminine energies of the universe. The Government of India awarded him the fourth highest civilian honour of the Padma Shri in 1992.

Biography 
Biren De was born in Faridpur, in the Bengal Presidency (now Bangladesh) on 8 October 1926. He relocated to Kolkata along with his family and joined the Government College of Art & Craft, Kolkata in 1944 for his graduate studies but did not accept the graduate diploma, citing a rift with the then college principal. He moved to New Delhi in 1949 when he was commissioned for a mural at the University of Delhi. His first overseas exhibition was held at Salon de Mai, Paris, in 1951. Returning to India, he joined the College of Art, Delhi, in 1952, as a member of their faculty and stayed at the job till 1963.

During his tenure at the College of Art, he spent one year in New York, on a Fulbright Scholarship. It was after this period, his paintings started to depict tantric symbols. In 1966, his works were exhibited at the Kumar's Gallery, New Delhi and Hayward Gallery, London. His works have since been displayed at several places including National Gallery of Modern Art, New Delhi, Berlin State Museum and the National Gallery, Prague, Royal Academy of Arts, London, Tokyo festival of India of 1988, and at the biennales in Venice, Tokyo, São Paulo, Mainichi and Sydney.

De received the Lalit Kala Akademi National Award in 1958 which he received a second time in 1964. The Government of India included him in the Republic Day honours list for the civilian award of the Padma Shri in 1992. He was elected as the Fellow of Lalit Kala Akademi in 2006. He died on 12 March 2011, at the age of 84.

Exhibitions 
List of selected exhibitions:

 Salon de Mai, Paris - 1951
 Freemasons Hall, New Delhi. - 1952
 All India Fine Arts and Crafts Society (AIFACS) - 1953, 54 and 56
 Lalit Kala Akademi, New Delhi - 1953 and 64
 Mainichi Biennale, Tokyo - 1959 and 61
 Contemporary Art from India, Museum Folkwang, Essen - 1960
 São Paulo Biennale, Brazil - 1961
 Venice Biennale, Italy - 1962
 Ten Contemporary Indian Painters, Cambridge–MIT Institute - 1965
 Hayward Gallery, London - 1966
 Pittsburgh International Show, USA - 1967
 International Triennale India, New Delhi - 1968, 71, 75, 78 and 82
 Contemporary Indian Painting exhibition, Washington DC - 1971
 Contemporary Indian Painting exhibition, Pasadena - 1971
 Contemporary Indian Painting exhibition, - Toronto 1971
 Chanakya Gallery, New Delhi - 1971
 Contemporary Indian Art, USSR - 1972
 Contemporary Indian Art, Greece - 1972
 25 Years of Indian Art, New Delhi - 1972
 25 Years of Indian Art, Bombay - 1972
 25 Years of Indian Art, Madras - 1972
 Sydney Biennale, Australia - 1973
 Contemporary Indian Painting, Washington DC - 1973
 Contemporary Indian Painting, Los Angeles - 1973
 Contemporary Indian Painting, Toronto - 1973
 Gallery Chemould, Bombay - 1973
 Gallery Chemould, Bombay - 1974
 Indian Painting Today, Belgium - 1973
 Indian Painting Today, Yugoslavia - 1973
 Indian Painting Today, Bulgaria - 1973
 Indian Painting Today, Belgium - 1974
 Indian Painting Today, Yugoslavia - 1974
 Indian Painting Today, Bulgaria - 1974

See also 

 Tantra

References

External links 
 Biren De - An Innovative Journey of Five Decades
 
 

Recipients of the Padma Shri in arts
1926 births
2011 deaths
People from Faridpur District
20th-century Bengalis
21st-century Bengalis
Indian male painters
Government College of Art & Craft alumni
20th-century Indian painters
Artists from Kolkata
Painters from West Bengal
Fellows of the Lalit Kala Akademi
20th-century Indian male artists